The People's Democratic Party (PDP), known until 2017 as the People's Democratic Front (PDF), is a left-wing political party in Taiwan. The party has no official leadership or membership system, and instead uses a unique system of nominating electoral candidates. Supporters of the party are mainly concerned with issues such as labor rights, indigenous rights, LGBT rights, sex workers' rights, immigration, and environmental protection.

History 
In the 2014 local elections, PDP candidate Wang Zhian was elected as a representative of the Yanshan Li area in Shilin District, Taipei, the first and only time the PDP held office.

In June 2016, nearly 70 percent of the PDP's candidates were graduates, lecturers, or professors from the Department of Psychology at Fu Jen Catholic University, while the rest were composed of representatives from workers' unions and LGBT rights groups.

Gallery

References

External links 
 
 

2011 establishments in Taiwan
Democratic socialist parties
Feminist parties
Labour parties
Political parties established in 2011
Progressive parties in Taiwan
Socialist parties in Taiwan